Blanchman's Farm is a   Local Nature Reserve in Warlingham in Surrey. It is owned by Tandridge District Council and managed by the Blanchman's Farm Committee and the Downlands Countryside Project.

This site has woodland, two meadows, a pond and an orchard. Fauna include foxes, roe deer, wood mice and black hairstreak butterflies.

There is access from Limpsfield Road.

References

Local Nature Reserves in Surrey